6-Phosphogluconate dehydrogenase (6PGD) is an enzyme in the pentose phosphate pathway. It forms ribulose 5-phosphate from 6-phosphogluconate:

6-phospho-D-gluconate + NAD(P)+  D-Ribulose 5-phosphate + CO2 + NAD(P)H + H+

It is an oxidative carboxylase that catalyses the decarboxylating reduction of 6-phosphogluconate into ribulose 5-phosphate in the presence of NADP. This reaction is a component of the hexose mono-phosphate shunt and pentose phosphate pathways (PPP). Prokaryotic and eukaryotic 6PGD are proteins of about 470 amino acids whose sequences are highly conserved. The protein is a homodimer in which the monomers act independently: each contains a large, mainly alpha-helical domain and a smaller beta-alpha-beta domain, containing a mixed parallel and anti-parallel 6-stranded beta sheet. NADP is bound in a cleft in the small domain, the substrate binding in an adjacent pocket.

Biotechnological significance 
Recently, 6PGD was demonstrated to catalyze also the reverse reaction (i.e. reductive carboxylation) in vivo. Experiments using Escherichia coli selection strains revealed that this reaction was efficient enough to support the formation of biomass based solely on CO2 and pentose sugars. In the future, this property could be exploited for synthetic carbon fixation routes.

Clinical significance
Mutations within the gene coding this enzyme result in 6-phosphogluconate dehydrogenase deficiency, an autosomal hereditary disease affecting the red blood cells.

As a possible drug target
6PGD is involved in cancer cell metabolism so 6PGD inhibitors have been sought.

See also
Parietin, a 6PGD inhibitor

References

Further reading 

 

NADPH-dependent enzymes
NADH-dependent enzymes
EC 1.1.1